is a 2008 Japanese action comedy horror film written and directed by Noboru Iguchi, and starring Minase Yashiro, Asami, Kentarō Shimazu and Honoka. The plot follows an orphaned Japanese schoolgirl whose life is destroyed when her brother is killed by a son of a Ninja-Yakuza clan. When her hand is cut off, she replaces it with a makeshift machine gun and seeks revenge.

Special effects were completed by Yoshihiro Nishimura, who went on to direct Tokyo Gore Police. It was initially released in the United States on May 23, 2008 before premiering in Japan on August 2, 2008.

Plot
Ami Hyūga is an average high school girl whose world comes crashing down when her brother Yu and his friend Takeshi Sugihara are killed by bullies, led by Sho Kimura. As Ami tracks down Sho, she discovers that the bullies are associated with a ninja-yakuza family. She goes after the clan for revenge, but they brutally overpower her, cutting off her left arm. Ami escapes and seeks shelter with Takeshi's parents, Suguru and Miki Sugihara, two kindly mechanics who fit her with a multi-barrelled machine gun prosthetic. Ami and Miki (who uses a chainsaw) pursue the clan, massacring them one by one. Their victims' families, meanwhile, band together to get revenge.

Eventually, they reach the yakuza's hiding place. As the fight continues, Miki loses her right foot and eventually dies. Ami loses her machine gun during her fight with Sho's father Ryūgi Kimura, but gets Miki's chainsaw. Finding Sho with hostages to keep Ami at bay, his mother Violet Kimura manages to disarm Ami while attempting to kill her with her drill bra. Noticing one of the hostages wet himself, Ami takes advantage and trips Violet onto the urine, electrocuting her. She then beheads Sho and Violet. Feeling she has nothing left to live for, she attempts to commit suicide. At that moment, Ami hears noise behind her and turns, sword at the ready.

Production
According to writer and director Iguchi, the idea for The Machine Girl went back to a simple idea he had about a one-armed girl in a bikini looking for revenge. The idea for the machine gun arm came later.

Cast
 Minase Yashiro  – Ami Hyuga
 Asami Miyajima – Miki Sugihara
 Noriko Kijima – Yoshie
 Honoka – Violet Kimura
 Yūya Ishikawa – Suguru Sugihara
 Kentarō Shimazu – Ryūgi Kimura
 Ryosuke Kawamura – Yu Hyuga
 Nobuhiro Nishihara – Sho Kimura
 Taro Suwa – Kimura gang member

English dub Version
The English dubbed version was dubbed at NYAV Post in the United States and Philippines.

Brina Palencia – Ami Hyuga
Carrie Keranen – Miki Sugihara
Kevin T. Collins – Suguru Sugihara
Charles Bunting – Ryūgi Kimura
Stephanie Sheh – Yoshie
Michael Sinterniklaas – Yu Hyuga
Christopher Kromer – Sho Kimura
Drew Aaron – Takeshi Sugihara, Teppei
Wayne Grayson – Kitamura
Dan Green – Yusume
Jason Griffith – Ryota, various
Erica Schroeder – Masako
Mike Pollock – Sushi Chef
Brandon Potter – Kaneko
Dara Seitzman – Sumire
Robby Sharpe – Hiroshi
Christine Shipp – Yumiko, Old Lady
Tom Wayland – Shinsuke
David Wills – Suguano

Release

The movie premiered at the Yubari International Fantastic Film Festival in March 2008. It was released theatrically in the United States on May 23, 2008 and on DVD June 3, 2008, and in Japan on August 2, 2008. The Japanese DVD from Nikkatsu came out January 23, 2009 as a 2 disc set including the short . Tokyo Shock, the Media Blaster label which released the original US DVD, announced that they were bringing out a two-disc special titled The Machine Girl Remix on August 4, 2009. The set includes the Shyness Machine Girl short, renamed Machine Girlite.

Reception 
The film's reception has been mixed to positive. It currently holds a 63% "fresh" rating on Rotten Tomatoes from eight reviews.

Rating 
The film was rated 18 in countries such as Chile, Peru and Spain because of nonstop gore, bloody action sequences and a rape scene with suggested necrophiliac overtones.

Legacy 
A direct-to-video sequel called  was released on January 23, 2009 along with the Japanese DVD of The Machine Girl.

The American electronic music project Machine Girl was named after the film.

References

External links 
 
 MachineGirl.net
 
 
 
 Internal Bleeding 
 Nippon Cinema 

2008 films
2008 action films
2008 horror films
Japanese action comedy films
Films directed by Noboru Iguchi
Girls with guns films
Japanese vigilante films
Japanese comedy horror films
Japanese action horror films
2000s exploitation films
Japanese films about revenge
Japanese splatter films
Tokyo Shock
2008 action comedy films
Yakuza films
2008 comedy films
2000s Japanese films
2000s Japanese-language films